The 2019 F4 Chinese Championship (Shell Helix FIA F4 Chinese Championship) was the fifth season of the F4 Chinese Championship. It began on 12 April at the Shanghai International Circuit and finished on 28 September at the same place after one double header, five triple header rounds. First round being run as a support for the Chinese Grand Prix in Shanghai, for the Formula One World Championship, remaining five rounds of them co-hosted with the China Formula Grand Prix championship.

Teams and Drivers

Race calendar and results
All rounds were held in China. For the first time the series supported the Formula 1 Chinese Grand Prix. The remaining events supported the China Formula Grand Prix championship and 2019 F3 Asian Championship.

Championship standings
Points were awarded as follows:

Drivers' Championship

Teams' Cup

References

External links 

  

F4 Chinese Championship seasons
Chinese
F4 Championship
Chinese F4